A Kauri bond is a bond denominated in New Zealand dollars that is issued by a foreign (i.e. non New Zealand) issuer. The first issue took place in 2004.

The name "kauri" comes from one of the New Zealand's larger native trees.

References 

Economy of New Zealand